Aistyonok (Little Stork; GRAU designation 1L271) is a counter-battery radar system developed and produced by Almaz-Antey for the Russian Armed Forces. It is a mobile radar for the purpose of detecting position of weapons such as field artillery and anti-aircraft weapons, calculating the trajectory of incoming shells, and the control of unmanned aerial vehicles.

The Aistyonok system was debuted in 2008, and has since been introduced for limited use in the North Caucasus by the Russian Armed Forces.

See also 
 Penicillin (counter-artillery system)
 AN/TPQ-36 Firefinder radar
 AN/TPQ-37 Firefinder radar
 Swathi Weapon Locating Radar
 Red Color

References

Ground radars
Weapon Locating Radar
Russian and Soviet military radars
Warning systems
Almaz-Antey products
Military equipment introduced in the 2000s